The Church of Santo Domingo de Silos is a church located in Millana, Spain. It was declared Bien de Interés Cultural in 1992.

References

Further reading

Bien de Interés Cultural landmarks in the Province of Guadalajara
Churches in the Province of Guadalajara